IC 5332, also known as PGC 71775 is an intermediate spiral galaxy about 30 million light-years away in the constellation Sculptor. IC 5332 is a delicate spiral galaxy that is unusually faint and beautifully symmetrical. As viewed from earth it is nearly face on. It has a very small central bulge and open spiral arms accounting for its classification (SABc). The galaxy lies in the direction of the galactic south pole.

IC 5332 is a late type spiral galaxy with observable star formation ongoing, though at such a low rate as to be a stable non-starburst galaxy. It is a somewhat tenuous spiral galaxy with a very low surface brightness of just 23.8 mag/squ arc sec.

See also
 List of galaxies
 List of nearest galaxies
 List of spiral galaxies

References

External links
 

Intermediate spiral galaxies
Sculptor (constellation)
5332